Angelariy is a village in Tervel Municipality, Dobrich Province, northeastern Bulgaria. Before 1942, it was named Soyaklii.

References

Villages in Dobrich Province